John Charles Broadhurst (born 20 July 1942) is an English priest of the Roman Catholic Church. Broadhurst was formerly a bishop of the Church of England and served as the Bishop of Fulham in the Diocese of London from 1996 to 2010. He resigned in order to be received into the Roman Catholic Church and became a priest in that church in 2011.

Early life
As a child Broadhurst was baptised in the Roman Catholic Church. He grew up in Hendon and was educated at Owens School in Islington.

Anglican ministry

Broadhurst trained as an Anglican ordinand at King's College London and its postgraduate facility at St Boniface College, Warminster. He was made a deacon in 1966 and ordained a priest in 1967.

Broadhurst began his ordained ministry at St Michael-at-Bowes, Palmerston Road, progressing through St Augustine's Wembley Park to the Parish of Wood Green (known as Wood Green Team Ministry). In 1972 he became the youngest elected member of the General Synod of the Church of England, a position he held until 1996. He became Area Dean of Brent while at Wembley Park, and East Haringey during his time at Wood Green. He was consecrated Bishop of Fulham (a "provincial episcopal visitor") on 24 September 1996. He had "the pastoral care of parishes which are opposed to the ordination of women".

Broadhurst was formerly the chairman of Forward in Faith and vice-chairman of the Church Union.

Roman Catholic ministry

In 2009 there were reports that Cardinal Christoph Schönborn had been meeting with Broadhurst at the suggestion of the Pope.

In October 2010, Broadhurst publicly stated his intention of being received into the Roman Catholic Church and entering a personal ordinariate for former Anglicans when it was established. In the same speech he described the Church of England's General Synod, in respect of its decision about the way in which objectors to the idea of ordaining women as bishops may or may not have legislative provision to protect their interests, as having been "... vindictive and vicious. It has been fascist in its behaviour, marginalising those who have been opposed to women's ordination",, in respect of which he later claimed on the BBC's Sunday programme to have been referring only to the House of Clergy in the Church of England's General Synod.

On 8 November 2010, Broadhurst announced that he intended leaving the Church of England to become a Roman Catholic.

Broadhurst was received into the Roman Catholic Church on 1 January 2011 at Westminster Cathedral. Also received at the same ceremony were his wife Judith, Andrew Burnham (former Bishop of Ebbsfleet), Keith Newton (former Bishop of Richborough) and his wife Gill and three former sisters of the Society of St Margaret (Walsingham)—Sister Carolyne Joseph, Sister Jane Louise and Sister Wendy Renate. On 13 January 2011 he was ordained to the diaconate with the two other former Church of England bishops, Andrew Burnham and Keith Newton. Two days later, on 15 January 2011, they were ordained to the priesthood together. On this date the Personal Ordinariate of Our Lady of Walsingham in England and Wales was officially established. On 17 March 2011 it was announced that he had been appointed an Honorary Prelate of His Holiness.

Personal life
In 1965 Broadhurst married his childhood sweetheart, Judith. He and his wife have four children; Jane, Mark, Sarah and Benedict. He is interested in genealogy, gardening and travelling. He was once a beekeeper and a fisherman.

Styles
 The Reverend John Broadhurst (1966–1996)
 The Right Reverend John Broadhurst (1996–2010)
 John Broadhurst (1 – 13 January 2011)
 The Reverend John Broadhurst (13 January 2011 – 17 March 2011)
 The Right Reverend Monsignor John Broadhurst (17 March 2011 – present)

References

1942 births
Living people
English Anglo-Catholics
Alumni of King's College London
Associates of King's College London
Bishops of Fulham
Anglo-Catholic bishops
20th-century Church of England bishops
21st-century Church of England bishops
21st-century English Roman Catholic priests
Anglican bishop converts to Roman Catholicism
People of the personal ordinariates
Married Roman Catholic clergy